Phoberogale is an extinct genus of hemicyonine bear, which lived during the Early Miocene, found in France, California, and Pakistan, from .

References 

Hemicyonids
Oligocene bears
Miocene carnivorans
Cenozoic mammals of Asia
Prehistoric mammals of Europe
Prehistoric mammals of North America
Fossil taxa described in 1995
Prehistoric carnivoran genera